Cornelia Halbheer (born 16 August 1992) is a Swiss sprinter who competes primarily in the 200 metres. She represented her country at the 2017 World Championships without reaching the semifinals.

International competitions

1Disqualified in the final

Personal bests

Outdoor
100 metres – 11.44 (+1.0 m/s, Zofingen 2017)
200 metres – 23.16 (-0.3 m/s, Zürich 2017)
400 metres – 62.25 (Basel 2013)
Long jump – 5.98 (-0.7 m/s, Langenthal 2016)

Indoor
60 metres – 7.47 (Magglingen 2017)
Long jump – 5.78 (Zürich 2016)

References

1992 births
Living people
Swiss female sprinters
World Athletics Championships athletes for Switzerland
Universiade medalists in athletics (track and field)
Universiade gold medalists for Switzerland
Medalists at the 2017 Summer Universiade